Sue Naegle is an American business executive. She was the president of HBO Entertainment from 2008 until 2013, when she departed and formed her own production company. She formerly worked as chief content officer at Annapurna Pictures. In August 2012, she was recognized as the 46th most powerful woman in the world by Forbes Magazine.

Early life and education 
Naegle grew up in Rockaway, New Jersey and attended Morris Hills High School. She graduated from Indiana University in 1991 with a Bachelor of Arts degree in telecommunications.

Career 

Naegle began her career in the mail room at United Talent Agency.  Two years later, she became one of their agents and went on to be named a partner and a director of the agency's TV department by 1999.  While there, she is credited with developing several successful programs, including The Bernie Mac Show and the HBO dramas Six Feet Under and True Blood.

In 2008, she was named President of HBO Entertainment, overseeing all original series and remained in that position until 2013.  HBO's Girls, Game of Thrones, Boardwalk Empire, and Veep were all developed under her leadership.  In August 2012, she was recognized as the 46th most powerful woman in the world by Forbes Magazine.  In the last year of her tenure, HBO won 27 Emmy Awards.  After her departure, she formed her own production company Naegle Ink.  She is an executive producer of the Cinemax series Outcast which began production in 2015. In 2016, she was named the head of Annapurna Television, a division of Annapurna Pictures. In 2019, she was named chief content officer of Annapurna Pictures, where she oversaw TV, film, and theatre development. In March 2022, Naegle departed the company.

Personal life 
She was married to comedian Dana Gould and has three daughters adopted from China named Liu Liu, Alice, and Nell.

References 

Year of birth missing (living people)
Living people
People from Rockaway, New Jersey
Indiana University alumni
American women chief executives
21st-century American women